Everything's Gonna Be Great  is a 1998 Turkish comedy film, directed by Ömer Vargı, starring Cem Yılmaz a small-time crook who steals from his brother's pharmaceutical warehouse.

Plot 
After a series of unsuccessful business ventures, Altan spends his time doing nothing until his wife Ayla leaves him. He plans to win her back with a new business venture - a bar. One night he bumps into his brother Nuri whom he hasn't seen for years and who works in a pharmaceutical warehouse. Altan sees a way to make some money and before long the brothers are involved in a dangerous game. Altan remains optimistic in spite of everything that happens to them, but Nuri is a fatalist. Together, they struggle for survival, hoping that everything will be great, or better still, superb.

Cast 
 Cem Yılmaz as Altan Çamlı
 Mazhar Alanson as Nuri Çamlı
 Ceyda Düvenci as Ayla Çamlı
 Selim Naşit Özcan as Cevat Çamlı
 Mustafa Uzunyılmaz as Nusret
 Adnan Tönel as Osman

External links 
 

1998 films
Films set in Turkey
Films set in Istanbul
1990s Turkish-language films
Turkish black comedy films
1990s black comedy films
1998 comedy films